Crush (stylized as CRUSH) is the second and final studio album overall by South Korean girl group 2NE1. It was released at midnight local time on February 27, 2014 through YG Entertainment. The album marked the group's first Korean album release since 2NE1 (2011) and the first studio album following To Anyone in four years. Crush was primarily produced by Teddy Park with additional contributions from Choice 37, Dee.P, Masta Wu, Choi Pil-kang and Peejay, as well as group leader CL. Stylistically, the album incorporates a broad range of musical influences, utilizing a variety of genres such as R&B, hip hop, dance, electronic, and reggae. 

Crush was positively received by music critics, who highlighted its modern electronic innovation and was listed as one of the best albums of the year worldwide by Rolling Stone and Fuse. Crush sold over 5,000 copies within four days in the United States and debuted at number 61 on the Billboard 200—simultaneously becoming the best-selling and the highest charting Korean album in the country, at the time of its release. The Japanese edition of Crush was made available on June 25, 2014 and peaked at number four on the Oricon Albums Chart. 

The first single from the album, "Come Back Home", peaked at number one on the Gaon Digital Chart for two consecutive weeks, becoming the group's ninth number-one hit in South Korea. The second single, "Gotta Be You", was also promoted on the music program Inkigayo and peaked at number three on the Gaon Digital Chart. Shortly after the release of Crush, the group commenced their third concert tour titled the All or Nothing World Tour, which visited multiple countries in East and Southeast Asia.

Background
On January 15, 2014, a poster for the group's upcoming All or Nothing World Tour was revealed on their agency's website, with hints about a new album. On February 19, it was revealed the album would contain of a total of 10 songs. All of the songs are new, except two; "Scream", which was previously featured on their 2012 Japanese language album Collection and an Acoustic Version of the album's title track. It was further revealed that the group's leader CL co-composed and wrote lyrics for three and five songs respectively, a first for the group.

Promotion and release
The digital download of the album was originally slated for release on midnight local time on February 24, 2014, but was pushed back to midnight local time on February 27, 2014, to coincide with CL's birthday on February 26.  Two music videos for its lead single "Come Back Home" were planned for release on February 28: a regular version and an unplugged version, although they were not formally released until March 2. The album in physical format was released on March 7. The music video for "Happy" was released on March 2.

Prior to the release of the album, 2NE1 held a private listening party for a group of 21 people selected from fans and music experts. It was revealed the new songs would be showcased for the first time at the opening dates of the group's All or Nothing World Tour in Seoul, South Korea on March 1 and 2. On May 20, 2NE1 released the music video for "Gotta Be You".

Reception

Critical reception

Crush was subject to positive reviews from music critics. Rolling Stone named it the sixth best pop album of 2014—the only appearance from an Asian artist on the list, with Charles Aaron writing "Almost two years after K-pop first giddily barged into America's imagination, the genre hasn't sustained a post-"Gangnam Style" wave, but the Seoul machine [2NE1] keeps humming." He further highlighted the diversity of all its tracks, and identified "MTBD" as the album's centerpiece. Fuse noted the group's "knack for genre-melding" and wrote that "After fans waited nearly four years for their second full-length album, the K-pop phenoms did not disappoint with a slew of forward-thinking, wholly-accessible tracks". They selected "Come Back Home", "Baby I Miss You" and "Gotta Be You" as the album standouts. The publication further included Crush in their year-end ranking of best 40 worldwide albums of 2014. 

Billboard ranked it the number one best K-pop album of the year, where they felt that it "proved more than worth the nearly-four-year wait" and highlighted the record's venture into new sonic territory with the fusion of different genres. August Brown of Los Angeles Times stated that "'Crush' has one foot in each country's pop music: K-pop's neon melodies, with sounds from America's trap and bass-music scenes. It's the most coherent LP to come out of this generation of K-pop." Writing for Pitchfork, Corban Goble commented that "The brash all-female Korean pop supergroup 2NE1's new album, Crush, bottles up contemporary trends as well as their usual EDM/reggae/hip-hop/R&B stylemash. But it represents a sleeker, more refined vision for the group." Conversely, Jeon Min-seok of webzine IZM had a more critical stance, feeling that the songs from the record were not as great as those found in the group's earlier albums.

Crush was also chosen as the 'Favorite Girl Group Album' on the "Girl Group Week Readers' Poll" hosted by Billboard, beating albums by Girls Aloud, Little Mix, Destiny's Child and the Spice Girls, as well as being included in Fuses mid-year list of the "25 Best Albums of 2014 So Far", alongside artists such as Coldplay, Michael Jackson, Pharrell Williams and Mariah Carey.

Commercial performance
Following its release, Crush sold over 5,000 copies within four days in the United States and debuted at number 61 on the Billboard 200. In doing so, the album broke two records: the best selling K-pop album in the country (the record has since been beaten by Exo's Exodus which sold 6,000 copies) and the highest charting album by a Korean artist on the Billboard 200, which would hold the record for two and a half years. In the group's native country South Korea, the album debuted and peaked at number two on the Gaon Album Chart in the chart issue dated March 2–8, 2014. According to Gaon's mid-year charts, the tracks from Crush have been downloaded over 5.2 million times. Due to its successful digital performance, it landed their fourth nomination for Album of the Year at the 2014 Melon Music Awards.

Controversy

Listeners accused the sixth track, "MTBD 멘붕(Mental Breakdown)" of having an audio sample of a young boy reciting Quran verses. This struck social media by storm amongst 2NE1's Muslim listeners, with even death threats being posted on both the group's and CL's social media pages. Because of this controversy, YG Entertainment released an alternate version of "MTBD" which omits the sample.

Japanese edition
The Japanese edition of Crush was released on June 25, 2014. The Limited Edition (Type A) contains the both Japanese and Korean versions of the album on 2 CD's, as well as a bonus DVD with music video clips and "making of Crush". The Special Edition (Type B) contains the DVD and Japanese version of the album while the Standard Edition (Type C) contains only the Japanese version of the album, without the DVD. The Fan Club Special Edition (Type D) has DVD footage of a fan club event from 2013. The Music Cards also contain information from the group's 2014 All or Nothing World Tour. All editions have alternate covers.

Accolades

Track listing

Korean edition

Japanese edition

Personnel
Credits adapted from the liner notes of Crush.

2NE1
Bom – vocals
CL – vocals
Dara – vocals
Minzy – vocals

Design
Kim Hae-young – art direction, artwork and design
Lee Hae-rin – artwork and design
Jang Ye-ji – artwork and design
Kim Young-joon – photography

Production
Jason Robert – mixing
Lee Kyung-joon – producer, recording
Shing Sung-kwan – recording
Lee Ji-hoon – recording
Tom Coyne – mastering at Sterling Sound, New York City
Yang Hyun-suk – executive producer
Teddy Park – producer

Management
Kim Nam-gook – management
Kim Se-ho – management
Park Heon-pyo – management
Son Ji-hoon – management
Kim Ji-yeon – assistant and promotion design
Park Hyun-ah – assistant and promotion design
Jung Ye-eun – assistant and promotion design
Choi Hae-ryung – assistant and promotion design
Kim Byung-goo – production strategy
Kim Sun-young – production strategy
Kim Jae-yeon – production strategy
Kim Ju-ran – production strategy
Shin Sung-jin – project director

Charts

Weekly charts

Monthly charts

Year-end charts

Sales and certifications

Release history

Korean version

Japanese version

References
Discography

Other references

External links
 2NE1 official site

YG Entertainment albums
Genie Music albums
2NE1 albums
Korean-language albums
Albums produced by Teddy Park